Bell Lake Provincial Park is a provincial park on the north shore of Bell Lake in the Porcupine Provincial Forest, Manitoba, Canada. It was designated as a provincial park in 1974.

The park is located within the Porcupine Hills Ecodistrict in the Mid-Boreal Uplands Ecoregion within the Boreal Plains Ecozone.

See also
List of protected areas of Manitoba
List of provincial parks in Manitoba

References

External links

Provincial parks of Manitoba
Protected areas established in 1961
1961 establishments in Manitoba
Protected areas of Manitoba